Auburn Union Elementary School District, California, USA, is composed of five schools: E.V. Cain Middle School, Rock Creek Elementary, Skyridge Elementary, Alta Vista Elementary, and Auburn Elementary. According to the accountability reports, there are 2600 students who go to the district. There were also 125 teachers in 2005.

References

External links 
 

School districts in Placer County, California